Lisa Ingildeeva (born December 4, 1988) is an Individual Rhythmic Gymnast from Germany. 

Ingildeeva was born in Moscow, Soviet Union.  When she was 6 years old she moved to Germany. In Berlin coaches noticed her talent and sent her to Fellbach-Schmiden to consult the coach, Galina Krylenko. Lisa has been the German National Champion in 2003, 2004 and 2005.

She competed at the 2004 Summer Olympics.

References

1988 births
Living people
German rhythmic gymnasts
Gymnasts at the 2004 Summer Olympics
Olympic gymnasts of Germany